The 2020 Tournoi de France was the first edition of the Tournoi de France, an invitational women's football tournament held in France. It took place from 4 to 10 March 2020.

Venues

Teams

Squads

Standings

Results
All times are local (UTC+1).

Goalscorers

Notes

References

2020 in women's association football
2019–20 in French football
2020 in Brazilian football
2020 in Canadian soccer
2019–20 in Dutch women's football
March 2020 sports events in France
Tournoi de France (Women)